Sankt Blasen is a former municipality in the district of Murau in the Austrian state of Styria. Since the 2015 Styria municipal structural reform, it is part of the municipality Sankt Lambrecht.

Geography
Sankt Blasen lies in the mountains that form the boundary between Styria and Carinthia.

References

Cities and towns in Murau District